

Kupanta-Kurunta of Arzawa
Kupanta-Kurunta was the first recorded king of Arzawa, in the late 15th century BC. He was defeated by Tudhaliya I and Arnuwanda I. He then attacked Arnuwanda's restive vassal Madduwatta at Zippasla. He had a daughter, who married Madduwatta.

Kupanta-Kurunta of Mira
Another Kupanta-Kurunta was born in the 1330s or 1320s BC at Mira in western Anatolia, in one of the princely families. His father joined a coup against king Mašḫuiluwa. The Hittite king Suppiluliuma I married Mašḫuiluwa to his daughter Muwatti and reinstalled him. Kupanta-Kurunta's father apparently died or was exiled soon after. Mašḫuiluwa then asked Suppiluliuma's successor Mursili II if he could adopt Kupanta-Kurunta as a son.

Mira remained a Hittite ally against Uhha-Ziti of Arzawa; but two years after Mursili's eclipse (which would mean 1310 BC) Mira rebelled under influence from "Great-House-Father" (probably an adventurer from Masa). Mursili quashed this rebellion, transferred Mašḫuiluwa to a priesthood in Hittite territory, and installed Kupanta-Kurunta as king.

In the early 13th century BC, Muwatalli II signed a treaty with Alaksandu of Wilusa. In it, he informed Alaksandu that he viewed Kupanta-Kurunta as the son of Muwatti and so a member of the Hittite royal family.

Kupanta-Kurunta is possibly the recipient of the Milawata letter.

Kupanta-Kurunta apparently supported Hattusili III over Hattusili's nephew Urhi-Tessup, "Mursili III". After Hattusili attained the kingdom, Kupanta-Kurunta received a letter from Pharaoh Rameses II which was copied to Hattusili. In it, the Pharaoh reassured Kupanta-Kurunta that Egypt remained a full ally of Hatti and entertained no plans to aid Urhi-Tessup in any further adventures.

References

14th-century BC births
Year of death unknown
Kings of Arzawa
15th-century BC people